Region Gotland, officially Gotlands kommun, is a municipality that covers the entire island of Gotland in Sweden. The city of Visby is the municipality's seat. Gotland Municipality is the 39th most populous municipality in Sweden.

History 
On 31 December 1951 there were 93 local government units on the island of Gotland, among them one city (Visby), one market town (Slite), one county council and a lot of rural municipalities, many of them with fewer than 100 inhabitants.

Twenty years later the situation was totally different.

The first of the two nationwide local government reforms in Sweden during the 20th century was implemented on 1 January 1952. From that date on, the rural municipalities on the island were regrouped into twelve new enlarged municipalities, which together with Visby, Slite and the Gotland County Council formed the new administrative pattern.

After ten years it was clear that this reform had not been radical enough and the work began preparing for the next one.

On 1 January 1971 the second and last local government reform was implemented in Sweden. All administrative and judicial differences between rural and urban areas were abolished. Only one type of municipality (kommun) existed from that date on. In the case of Gotland all the former entities were united into one single unit. As there was only one municipality in the county, also the County Council was abolished and merged into the new unitary municipality.

As the municipality has both local and regional functions, normally provided by the Municipalities of Sweden and the County councils of Sweden respectively, Gotland has a special status as a municipality and is officially called Region Gotland as of 2011.

Localities 
There are 16 urban areas (also called a Tätort or locality) in Gotland Municipality.

In the table the localities are listed according to the size of the population. The municipal seat is in bold characters.

Politics

Riksdag 
These are the results of the elections to the Riksdag held in Gotland since 1973. The results only include parties that have won representation in the Riksdag assembly at least once during this timeframe. The results of the Sweden Democrats were not listed at a municipal level by the SCB between 1988 and 1998 due to the party's small size at the time.

Blocs

This lists the relative strength of the socialist and centre-right blocs since 1973, but parties not elected to the Riksdag are inserted as "other", including the Sweden Democrats results from 1988 to 2006, but also the Christian Democrats pre-1991 and the Greens in 1982, 1985 and 1991. The sources are identical to the table above. The coalition or government mandate marked in bold formed the government after the election. New Democracy got elected in 1991 but are still listed as "other" due to the short lifespan of the party. "Elected" is the total number of percentage points from the municipality that went to parties who were elected to the Riksdag.

Local 
Election results:

Region 

When Gotland was made into a single municipality in the 1970s, the county council was abolished and its responsibilities transferred to the municipality, making it a unitary authority. During a trial period some of the authority normally held by the Gotland County Administrative Board, an agency of the national government, has also been devolved to the Gotland Municipality, as well as to two mainland councils. The municipality of Gotland is therefore in this respect also a region. It has responsibility for the public healthcare system and public transport.

Events organised by the municipality 
The municipality coordinates the annual Almedalen Week (Almedalsveckan), an important meetingplace for everyone involved in Swedish politics. During the week, representatives from the political parties in the Riksdag take turns to hold speeches in the Almedalen park in Visby.

See also 
Politics of Sweden
Elections in Sweden
List of Gotland Governors

References 
Statistics Sweden

External links 

Gotland Municipality – Official site
Coat of arms

Municipalities of Gotland County
Gotland
1971 establishments in Sweden